A Stroke of 1000 Millions is a 1966 Italian-Spanish-French Eurospy film directed by Paolo Heusch and starring Rik Van Nutter. It was shot in Egypt, Spain, Istanbul and Rome.

Cast  
  Rik Van Nutter as Fraser 
 Marilù Tolo as Prinzi
 Eduardo Fajardo as Teopulos
 Philippe Hersent as Gottlieb
 José Jaspe   	
 Massimo Pietrobon  as Shelby
 Jacques Santi
 Rita Berger  as Liane 
 Peter Haller  as Captain 
 Tom Felleghy as Fraser's Boss

References

External links

1966 films
1960s spy thriller films
Italian spy thriller films
Spanish spy thriller films
French spy thriller films
Films directed by Paolo Heusch
Films scored by Piero Umiliani
1960s Italian-language films
1960s Italian films
1960s Spanish films
1960s French films